The North American, Central American and Caribbean Athletic Association (NACAC) is the continental confederation governing body of athletics for national governing bodies and multi-national federations within Northern America, Central America, and the Caribbean. NACAC is one of six area associations of World Athletics (WA), previously named the International Association of Athletics Federations (IAAF). NACAC was founded on December 10, 1988, in San Juan, Puerto Rico.

Presidents
Amadeo Francis of Puerto Rico was elected as the first president of the association. He was re-elected in 1999 and 2003.  In 2007 Neville "Teddy" McCook (Jamaica) was elected as new president and was re-elected in 2011.  After McCook died on February 11, 2013, Alain Jean-Pierre from Haiti, treasurer of NACAC and president of the Central American and Caribbean Athletic Confederation (CACAC), acted as interim president.  On August 7, 2013, Víctor López from Puerto Rico, president of the Association of Panamerican Athletics (APA), was elected new president for the period 2013–2019. On July 2, 2019, during the NACAC Congress held in Querétaro, Mexico Mike Sands of Bahamas was elected president for the period 2019-2022.

Competitions
NACAC Championships
NACAC Under-23 Championships
NACAC Cross Country Championships
NACAC Race Walking Championships
NACAC Mountain Running Championships
Pan American Combined Events Cup (organised by the Association of Panamerican Athletics (APA), formerly: NACAC Combined Events Championships)
Central American and Caribbean Championships (organised by the Central American and Caribbean Athletic Confederation (CACAC))

Member associations

See also

Association of Panamerican Athletics (APA)
Central American and Caribbean Athletic Confederation (CACAC)
Central American Isthmus Athletic Confederation (CADICA)
South American Athletics Confederation (CONSUDATLE)

References

External links
NACAC official website

Athletics organizations
Sports organizations established in 1988
Athletics
 
Central America and the Caribbean